Alex Price (born 1985) is a British actor.

Alex Price may also refer to:

Alex Price (cricketer) (born 1995), Australian cricketer
Alex Price (musician) (born 1980), Canadian musician
Alex Price, character in American Werewolf in London